Michael James Duff FRS, FRSA is a British theoretical physicist and pioneering theorist of supergravity who is the Principal of the Faculty of Physical Sciences and Abdus Salam Chair of Theoretical Physics at Imperial College London.

Education
Duff completed his Bachelor of Science in Physics Queen Mary College, London in 1969. He then went on to his Doctor of Philosophy in theoretical physics in 1972 at Imperial College London supervised by the Nobel Laureate Abdus Salam. He did postdoctoral fellowships at the International Centre for Theoretical Physics, University of Oxford, King's College London, Queen Mary College London and Brandeis University.

Academic career
After his postdoctoral fellowships, he returned to Imperial College in 1979 on a Science Research Council Advanced Fellowship and joined the faculty there in 1980. He took leave of absence to visit the Theory Division in CERN, first in 1982 and then again as a Staff Member from 1984 to 1987 when he became Senior Physicist. He has held Visiting Professorships and Fellowships at the University of Texas, Austin; the University of California, Santa Barbara, the University of Kyoto and the Isaac Newton Institute, University of Cambridge. He took up his professorship at Texas A&M University in 1988 and was appointed Distinguished Professor in 1992. In  1999 he moved to the University of Michigan, where he was Oskar Klein Professor of Physics. In 2001, he was elected first Director of the Michigan Center for Theoretical Physics and was re-elected in 2004. He returned again to Imperial College, London and became Professor of Physics and Principal of the Faculty of Physical Sciences in 2005.  He was appointed Abdus Salam Professor of Theoretical Physics in 2006. He won the Dirac Medal of the IOP in 2017.

Contributions
His interests lie in unified theories of the elementary particles, quantum gravity, supergravity, Kaluza–Klein theory, superstrings, supermembranes and M-theory.  He is a Fellow of the Royal Society, a Fellow of the American Physical Society, a Fellow of the Institute of Physics (UK), a  Fellow of the Royal Society of Arts and Recipient of the 2004 Meeting Gold Medal, El Colegio Nacional, Mexico.

He is the editor of The World in Eleven Dimensions: Supergravity, Supermembranes and M-theory, ., a collection of notable scientific articles on string theory.

References

External links
 Imperial College faculty page for Duff
 
 

1949 births
Academics of Imperial College London
Alumni of Queen Mary University of London
Alumni of Imperial College London
People associated with CERN
English physicists
Fellows of the Institute of Physics
Fellows of the Royal Society
Living people
Scientists from Manchester
British string theorists
University of Michigan faculty
Fellows of the American Physical Society